Iron Curtain is an active protection system (APS) created in 2005 and designed by Artis, an American technology development and manufacturing firm. The system deactivates threats, such as rocket-propelled grenades (RPG) and other shoulder-launched missiles.

The system was created as part of an accelerated acquisition effort by the U.S. Army to characterize and field active protection systems as quickly as possible. It was evaluated on the Stryker Infantry Carrier Vehicle, with two systems undergoing tests by the U.S. Army: one at Aberdeen Proving Ground in Maryland and the other at Redstone Arsenal in Alabama.

Technology
Iron Curtain uses a radar to detect any incoming projectiles. As projectiles come into close range, the optical sensor tracks it within  of accuracy to select an aim point and determine which ballistic countermeasure to fire. The countermeasure deflagrates the RPG warhead without detonating it, leaving the dudded round to bounce off the vehicle's side.
Because of its shelf-like design, the system can be modified to protect almost any surface, from the sides of the vehicle to all-around protection, including a turret. Artis claims that the Iron Curtain can be enhanced to protect against “more challenging threats” like the RPG-29 and RPG-32 ‘Hashim’ multipurpose anti-tank grenade launchers, which utilize tandem warheads for penetrating tanks with explosive reactive armor. Iron Curtain is also able to defend against ATGMs (Anti-Tank Guided Missiles).

Safety
The system, which began in 2005 as a DARPA program, is able to defeat threats even if fired from an extremely close range. It has undergone significant safety testing, including temperature and shock testing, and its software architecture has been approved by the U.S. military's Joint Services Weapons Safety Review Process. The countermeasure fires straight down or up, neutralizing the incoming threat within inches of the vehicle and thereby separating the system from many others which intercept threats several meters out, resulting in minimal risk of collateral damage to dismounted troops or civilians.

Radar
Iron Curtain is designed to be highly modular, and the system's radar does not need to track the threat; hence, a relatively inexpensive radar will suffice. To date, two radars have been integrated onto Iron Curtain: the Mustang radar developed by Mustang Technology Group in Plano, Texas and the RPS-10 radar, built by RADA Electronic Industries.

Government testing
In 2016, the U.S. Army began an expedited effort to install and characterize several APS's, including Iron Curtain on the Stryker fighting vehicle, in preparation for fielding decisions by the Army.

In April 2013, the company announced it achieved a perfect score during rigorous government tests. “We proved not only that Iron Curtain defeats threats and saves lives, but the risk from collateral damage is minimal, especially when compared with the alternative," said the company's CEO, Keith Brendley. Brendley affirmed that the system is ready to be deployed onto battlefields.

Vehicles integrated
To date, the system has been integrated onto four ground vehicles, including tracked, turreted, and wheeled vehicles. In 2016, Iron Curtain was selected for integration onto the U.S. Army's Stryker. However, in August 2018 the Army decided not to continue qualifying Iron Curtain onto the Stryker, saying that while the system "generally worked in concept" and was "generally able to hit its targets," it was still not mature enough.

Previously, Iron Curtain was integrated onto the Army's Ground Combat Vehicle built by BAE Systems; the MATV built by Oshkosh Defense; and the Humvee built by AM General. 

In addition, General Dynamics Land Systems designed the system for integration onto its LAV III.

See also
Active protection system

References

External links
Artis Iron Curtain website
DARPA video of Iron Curtain demonstration, shooting down missile
National Geographic TV report on Iron Curtain

DARPA projects
Missile countermeasures
Armoured fighting vehicle equipment
Weapons countermeasures
Land active protection systems